Boris Petrovich Tokin (Токин, Борис Петрович; 21 July 1900, in Krychaw – 16 September 1984, in Leningrad) was a Russian biologist known for coining the term phytoncides, and promoting and systematizing their use. He also as chair of the Society of Materialist Biologists wrote articles integrating the works of Charles Darwin with Marx and Engels.

References

1900 births
1984 deaths
Russian biologists
20th-century biologists